Dr. Gyula Ferdinandy de Hidasnémeti (1 June 1873 – 16 January 1960) was a Hungarian politician, who served as Interior Minister between 1920 and 1921. During the Sándor Simonyi-Semadam's cabinet he was the Minister of Justice, following which (in the government of Pál Teleki) Ferdinandy replaced this position to the Minister of the Interior. He reformed the country's franchise system.

Publications
A vármegyék reformja (1909)
A hadügyi közigazgatás reformja (1910)
Az önkormányzati alkalmazottak felelőssége (1911) - awarded
A község szociális feladatai (1916)

References
 Magyar Életrajzi Lexikon

1873 births
1960 deaths
Politicians from Košice
Hungarian Interior Ministers
Justice ministers of Hungary